is a window system developed for the Plan 9 from Bell Labs operating system by Rob Pike. According to its documentation, the system has little graphical fanciness, a fixed user interface, and depends on a three-button mouse. Like much of the Plan 9 operating system, many operations work by reading and writing to special files.

Because of the limitations stemming from its unusual implementation,  has been completely rewritten into its successor rio in recent Plan 9 versions.

See also
Plan 9 from Bell Labs — the operating system
mux — the predecessor to 
rio — the new Plan 9 windowing system
9wm — an X window manager which attempts to emulate

External links
, the Plan 9 Window System by Rob Pike — The original paper.

Plan 9 from Bell Labs